The list of shipwrecks in May 1883 includes ships sunk, foundered, grounded, or otherwise lost during May 1883.

1 May

3 May

4 May

5 May

7 May

9 May

10 May

11 May

12 May

13 May

14 May

16 May

17 May

18 May

19 May

21 May

23 May

24 May

25 May

30 May

31 May

Unknown date

References

1883-05
Maritime incidents in May 1883